This article lists the fixtures of the knockout stage for the 2018 Uber Cup in Bangkok, Thailand. It began on 24 May with the quarter-finals and ended on 26 May with the final match of the tournament.

Qualified teams
The top two placed teams from each of the eight groups will qualify for the knockout stage.

Bracket

Quarter-finals

Japan vs Chinese Taipei

South Korea vs Canada

Indonesia vs Thailand

Denmark vs China

Semi-finals

Japan vs South Korea

Thailand vs China

Final

Japan vs Thailand

References

Uber knockout stage